EO, or Eight Ones, is an 8-bit EBCDIC character code represented as all ones (binary 1111 1111, hexadecimal FF). It is used for synchronisation purposes, such as a time and media filler.

When translated from the EBCDIC character set to code pages with a C1 control code set, it is typically mapped to hexadecimal code 9F, in order to provide a unique character mapping in both directions.

See also
0xFF
Delete character

References

Control characters